Sepidium magnum is a species of beetles of the family Tenebrionidae.

Description
This species is among the largest of the genus. Body is brownish-black, while the head, prothorax, legs, and antennae show a pale fawn-coloured pubescence. Prothorax has a large prominent rounded tubercle. The surface of elytra is divided by two longitudinal sinuous carinse, with reticulating ridges on the sides.

Distribution
This species can be found in Somalia.

References

 Global Names Index
 Universal Biological Indexer
 Tenebrionidae Database
 C. J. Gahan, M.A., Gilbert J. Abrow  INSECTS AND ARACHNIDS FROM SOMALILAND

Pimeliinae
Endemic fauna of Somalia
Beetles described in 1900